Chalciope erecta is a moth of the family Noctuidae first described by George Hampson in 1902. It is found in South Africa, Kenya and Somalia.

References

Catocalinae